Nadia von Bertouch (born 28 August 1995) is an Australian rules footballer who played for St Kilda in the AFL Women's (AFLW). In March 2021, she was delisted by St Kilda.

References

External links

 

Living people
1995 births
St Kilda Football Club (AFLW) players
Australian rules footballers from South Australia
Sportswomen from South Australia